Dark Intruder is a 1965 horror film made for TV that was released theatrically, and starring Leslie Nielsen, Mark Richman and Judi Meredith. The film is set in San Francisco in 1890 concerning playboy sleuth and occult expert Brett Kingsford (Nielsen). This atmospheric black-and-white film is only 59 minutes long, was directed by Harvey Hart, and was the pilot for a failed television series called The Black Cloak and was written by Barré Lyndon.

The Black Cloak was to be produced by Alfred Hitchcock's television company, Shamley Productions, which also produced Alfred Hitchcock Presents, The Alfred Hitchcock Hour and Suspicion, as well as the film Psycho. When the pilot was deemed too scary and violent for mid-sixties television, NBC sold it to Universal Pictures, where Hitchcock was under contract. Universal re-edited the pilot into a feature film and distributed it to drive-in theaters as the second feature to a double bill that also included William Castle’s I Saw What You Did (also 1965).

In plot and character it greatly resembles Chamber of Horrors (1966), which was made the next year and had a similar fate. Critic Leonard Maltin wrote that Dark intruder featured: "Intricate plot and exceptional use of the time period blending with suspense" and that this made it "a one-of-a-kind movie." Dark Intruder showed up from time to time on late night TV throughout the 1970s.

Plot
The film opens, after the murder of a woman in dark alley by a mysterious caped figure, on a scene between Kingsford and his fiancé Eveleyn Lang (Meredith). Kingsford is an expert on the supernatural and along with his dwarf assistant Nikola (Charles Boldender) he is called in by police to uncover the scheme of a Sumerian demon to return to earth and take over a human body. A series of murders of women similar to those committed in 1888 London by Jack the Ripper has taken place in San Francisco; in the San Francisco killings, however, a series of statuettes carved of ivory and depicting a repulsive reptilian head is left beside each body. In each statue found at a victim’s feet, the demon in the little figurines emerges from the back of a man, budding out farther with each crime. It as though with each killing, the demon is freeing itself from its host a little bit more. There also seem to be connections between the four victims.

Kingsford initially consults an old Chinese curio dealer, Chi Zang (Peter Brocco) for advice. The dealer, (whose shop has a statue of a multi-armed Chinese god who may be Yu Lueh) shows Kingsford a mummified creature with a hideous fanged mouth which the priest claims is a Sumerian demon. The mummified demon is accompanied by a seven-spoked wheel. The priest says that the demon will commit seven killings, one for each spoke, until it accomplishes its purposes, according to mystic periods of time known only to itself. Kingsford picks up the small mummy but drops it when it becomes hot and leaves him with a scratched hand.

Kinsford then goes to the import shop of his friend Robert Vandenburg where they earlier arranged to meet. A shadow trails him, and in the shop, Kingsford is attacked by the hump-backed, long-fingernailed, black hat-wearing, caped and demonically-growling figure who murdered the woman at the start of the film. Kingsford fends off the attack and the figure disappears. The police arrive, as does Vandenburg.

Cast
 Leslie Nielsen as Brett Kingsford
 Peter Mark Richman as Robert Vandenburg
 Judi Meredith as Evelyn Lang
 Gilbert Green as Harvey Misbach
 Charles Bolender as Nikola
 Werner Klemperer as Professor Malaki
 Vaughn Taylor as Dr. Burdett
 Peter Brocco as Chi Zang
 Bill Quinn as The Neighbor

Reception

Author and film critic Leonard Maltin awarded the film three out of four stars, calling it 'a nearly flawless supernatural thriller'. In his review, Maltin commended the film's intricate plot, and "exceptional use of time period", but criticized the film's uneven performances.
Dave Sindelar, on his website Fantastic Movie Musings and Ramblings gave the film a positive review, commending the film's atmosphere, interesting characters, and surprises in the film's story.
TV Guide however, gave the film a mixed review; awarding it two out of five stars.

References

Further reading
 "Dark Intruder" in Andrew Migliore and John Strysik, The Lurker in the Lobby: A Guide to the Cinema of H.P. Lovecraft, Seattle WA: Armitage House, 1999, pp. 10–11.
 "Dark Intruder" in Charles P. Mitchell, The  Complete H.P. Lovecraft Filmography. Westport CT and London: Greenwood Press, 2001, pp. 73–77.

External links

 

1965 television films
American horror television films
1965 horror films
1965 films
Films scored by Lalo Schifrin
Films directed by Harvey Hart
Universal Pictures films
Films set in San Francisco
1960s English-language films